The Gift of the Holy Ghost may refer to:
 In Christianity, the bestowing of the Holy Spirit (or Holy Ghost), also called the Baptism with the Holy Spirit
 It may also refer to the seven spiritual gifts given by the Holy Spirit 
 It may also refer to any other spiritual gift given by the Holy Spirit 
 In the Church of Jesus Christ of Latter-day Saints, the rite of Confirmation (Latter Day Saints)